Jacques Parizeau  (August 9, 1930June 1, 2015) was a Canadian politician and Québécois economist who was a noted  Quebec sovereigntist and the 26th premier of Quebec from September 26, 1994, to January 29, 1996.

Early life and career
Parizeau was born in Montreal, Quebec, the son of Germaine (née Biron) and Gérard Parizeau, from a family of wealth and privilege. Gérard Parizeau built one of Quebec’s great fortunes and one of the province’s largest financial firms from a brokerage he established in the 1930s. Jacques' great-grandfather was a founder of the Montreal Chambre de Commerce and his grandfather was a doctor of renown and a Chevalier of the Légion d’honneur.

As a teenager, Parizeau had radical views and distributed leaflets for Communist Fred Rose's election campaigns. While sympathetic to the Labor-Progressive Party he never joined.

His parents supported bilingualism and sent him to English summer camp.  He attended Collège Stanislas, a Roman Catholic private school. He went on to graduate with a PhD from the London School of Economics in London, England, as well as degrees at HEC Montréal, Paris Institute of Political Studies and Faculté de droit de Paris. Because of a prior commitment to return to instruct at HEC, he left England, where career opportunities were offered in British academia.  He served an internship with the Bank of Canada in Ottawa, and directed his brightest students to Queen's University in Kingston, Ontario for postgraduate studies.

Parizeau's predilection for three-piece, Savile Row suits, and proper manner of speaking French and English, earned him the nickname "Monsieur".

A believer in economic interventionism, he was one of the most important advisors to the provincial government during the 1960s, playing an important behind-the-scenes role in the Quiet Revolution. He was especially instrumental in the nationalization of Hydro-Québec (a hydro-electric utility) in 1962-1963, the nationalization of the Asbestos Corporation Limited mines in 1982, and worked with Eric Kierans to create the Quebec Pension Plan in 1963-1966.

He joked that the Quiet Revolution was essentially carried out by three or four cabinet ministers, two dozen civil servants and 50 chansonniers. (At the end of his career, he said that he would like to be remembered most for his contributions to the reformation of Quebec.)

Parizeau gradually became a committed sovereigntist, and officially joined the Parti Québécois (PQ) on September 19, 1969. In 1970, he became the president of the PQ’s executive council until 1973. He ran for office in the Montreal districts of Ahuntsic in 1970 and Crémazie in 1973, but lost in both.

After the PQ was elected to office in the 1976 provincial election, which saw Parizeau elected in the district of L'Assomption, the new premier, René Lévesque, appointed him as Minister of Finance.  Parizeau played an important role in the 1980 Quebec referendum campaign in favour of the government's proposals for sovereignty-association.

As Minister of Finance in Quebec, he was responsible for a number of innovative economic proposals, including the Quebec Stock Savings Plan ("QSSP") and the Fonds de solidarité (Solidarity Fund) FTQ in 1983. As of May 2020, the latter's net assets were $13.8 billion.

Married to Polish immigrant Alice Poznanska (1930–1990). Jacques Parizeau was criticized for supporting the Charter of the French Language. This law limits access to English-language public schools to children whose parents didn't receive their education in English in Canada, and was generally opposed by the English-speaking minority.

In 1984, he had a falling out with Lévesque. Lévesque had moved away from pursuing sovereignty to accept a negotiation with the Federal Government, called Beau Risque. Parizeau opposed this shift, resigned from Cabinet along with many other members, and temporarily retired from politics. Lévesque was taken by surprise with all these retirements and retired soon after. He was replaced by Pierre-Marc Johnson.

In 1987, Johnson also left the PQ leadership after losing the 1985 election.  Parizeau, still a widely liked figure, was elected to replace him as party leader on March 19, 1988.

It was revealed in 2013 that federal Prime Minister Brian Mulroney offered in 1987 to appoint Parizeau as an independent Senator in his attempt to secure passage of the Canada–United States Free Trade Agreement through the upper house as well as part of his strategy to achieve reconciliation with Quebec sovereigntists which led to the Meech Lake Accord. Parizeau rejected the offer and went on to become PQ leader and premier.

Elections, 1995 referendum and aftermath
In the 1989 election, Parizeau's first as PQ leader, his party did not fare well. But five years later, in the 1994 election, it won a majority government. Parizeau promised to hold a referendum on Quebec sovereignty within a year of his election, and despite many objections, he followed through on this promise. In the beginning, support for sovereignty was only about 40% in the public opinion polls. As the campaign wore on, however, support for the "Yes" side grew larger. This growth halted, however, and Parizeau came under pressure to hand more of the campaign over to the more moderate and conservative Lucien Bouchard, the popular leader of the federal Bloc Québécois party. Parizeau agreed and as the campaign progressed he lost his leadership role to Bouchard.

During the 1995 referendum he caused an uproar when it was reported by columnist Chantal Hébert in the La Presse newspaper that despite the guarantee of an offer of partnership with the rest of Canada before declaring sovereignty following a "Yes" vote, Parizeau had told a group of foreign diplomats that what mattered most was to get a majority vote from Quebec citizens for the proposal to secede from Canada because with that, Quebecers would be in a "lobster pot," evidently indicating that like lobsters in a lobster trap, Quebecers would not be able to escape the consequences of a vote for independence once it was cast. The "Yes" side would lose the referendum by 55,000 votes. In his concession speech, Parizeau said sovereignty had been defeated by "l'argent pis des votes ethniques" ("money and ethnic votes"), and referred to the Francophones who voted Yes in the referendum as "nous" (us) when he said that this majority group was, for the first time, no longer afraid of political independence.

Many suspected he may have been drinking. He resigned as PQ leader and Quebec premier the next day. The English-language media, as well as non-sovereigntist newspapers such as La Presse and Le Soleil, associated Parizeau's resignation only with these remarks, against which the sovereigntist-friendly media (notably the newspaper Le Devoir) argued that he had made the decision beforehand, drawing attention to a television interview conducted on the eve of the vote with the Groupe TVA channel in which Parizeau spoke of his intentions to step down in the event of defeat.  (This interview had previously been held under "embargo", which is to say that the station agreed not to broadcast it until the referendum was over.)

Parizeau was replaced by Lucien Bouchard as PQ leader and Quebec premier on January 29, 1996.

Parizeau retired to private life, but continued to make comments critical of Bouchard's new government and its failure to press the cause of Quebec independence. He owned an estate at his vineyard in France, a farm in the Eastern Townships of Quebec and a home in Montreal. His biographer is Pierre Duchesne.

In 2005 he spoke of the 1995 referendum in the Canadian Broadcasting Corporation documentary Breaking Point.

His wife and former secretary during his premiership, Lisette Lapointe won a seat in the National Assembly as a candidate for the PQ in the provincial riding of Crémazie in the 2007 Quebec general election.

In June 2008, along with the other four living former Premiers of Quebec, Parizeau was named a Grand Officer of the National Order of Quebec by Premier Jean Charest.

At a 2013 meeting of Option nationale, Parizeau stated to the room that the target of sovereignty for Quebec is still realizable, and that the PQ should make the maximum effort to attain it, including using public funds.

In October 2013, to the surprise of many Quebecers, Parizeau nuanced his earlier infamous "money and ethnic votes" statement to come out against the wholesale adoption of the Quebec Charter of Values, which would have banned most religious symbols and clothing in the public sector (but not the crucifix over the National Assembly President's chair).  "Federalism is turning into true defenders of minorities in Quebec," he said to Radio-Canada at the time. "We can't put ourselves in a situation like that." By "we", he meant the Franco-Quebecois, the majority in Quebec, and who had voted in the majority for sovereignty.

In an interview with 98.5 FM Montreal, Jacques Parizeau clarified the controversial comments he made in a 1995 speech following the sovereignty referendum's yes-side loss. He said that when he laid blame for the loss, he said "ethnic votes" and not the ethnic vote, and was referring to a coalition of Greek, Italian, and Jewish organizations which actively campaigned on the "no" side.

Parizeau let his PQ membership lapse and supported the fledgling party Option nationale and its youthful leader Jean-Martin Aussant.  After Pierre Karl Péladeau entered provincial politics, Parizeau publicly decried the state of the PQ. In September 2014, after the party's defeat in the general election, he stated that it faced "a field of ruin." During the PQ leadership campaign of 2015, Parizeau told Radio-Canada in his last televised interview that "the party was gradually demolished and it has lost its soul."

Elections as party leader
He lost the 1989 election, and won the 1994 election. He announced his resignation the day after the "Yes" side in the 1995 Quebec referendum was defeated.

Death
In a social media posting, Parizeau's wife announced his death after five months of hospitalization, on June 1, 2015. He was 84. On her Facebook page, Lapointe wrote:

His state funeral mass was held at Saint-Germain d’Outremont Roman Catholic church, the Parizeau family parish.

See also
 Parti Québécois Crisis, 1984
 Politics of Quebec
 List of Quebec premiers
 List of Quebec general elections
 Timeline of Quebec history
 Sovereignty Association
 History of the Quebec sovereigntist movement
 Politician and personality nicknaming in Quebec
 Pur et dur
 List of celebrities who own wineries and vineyards

References

Further reading

In English 
 Parizeau, Jacques. http://www.barakabooks.com/catalogue/an-independent-quebec.html An Independent Quebec, The Past, The Present and The future]", Baraka Books, 2010
 Gordon, Stanley. "Parizeau, Jacques ", in The Canadian Encyclopedia. Historica Foundation, 2008
 "Genealogy of Jacques Parizeau", in NosOrigines.qc.ca, 2008
 Pelletier, Francine. "Public Enemy Number One: The Life and Times of Jacques Parizeau", in Life and Times. Canadian Broadcasting Corporation, February 24, 2004
 "Interview with Jacques Parizeau", in the site Perrizo - A Journey Throughout History. Perrizo Family History Committee, August 6, 1998

 In French 
 Duchesne, Pierre (2004). Jacques Parizeau. Tome III: Le Régent - 1985-1995 Montréal: Éditions Québec Amérique, 578 p.
 Duchesne, Pierre (2002). Jacques Parizeau. Tome II: Le Baron - 1970-1985 Montréal: Éditions Québec Amérique, 544 p.
 Duchesne, Pierre (2001). Jacques Parizeau. Tome I: Le Croisé - 1930-1970 Montréal: Éditions Québec Amérique, 624 p.
 Richard, Laurence (1992). Jacques Parizeau, un bâtisseur, Montreal: Éditions de l'Homme, 249 p.
 "Jacques Parizeau", dossier at Vigile.net, 2008
 "Jacques Parizeau", dossier at L'Encyclopédie de l'Agora, updated May 25, 2006
 "Jacques Parizeau. « Je vous parle de l'homme »", interview by Michaëlle Jean, research by Florence Meny at Radio-Canada.ca, January 2003 (requires Flash)
 Pelletier, Francine (2003). Monsieur, Montreal : Macumba International, 52 min.
 McKenzie, Robert (1972). Comment se fera l'indépendance. Entrevues de: René Lévesque, Jacques Parizeau, Jacques-Yvan Morin et Camille Laurin, Montreal, : Editions du Parti québécois, 56 p.
 Lacombe, Pierre and Lacoursière, Jacques (2005). Jacques Parizeau, Montreal : CinéFête, 47 min.
 Lepage, Marquise (2005). Jacques Parizeau, l'homme derrière le complet trois pièces, Productions Pixcom, 120 min. (broadcast on Société Radio-Canada and RDI)

Personal works

Collaboration
 "Les post-keynésiens et la politique économique contemporaine", in Angers, François-Albert (ed.) Essai sur la centralization. Analyse des principes et perspectives canadiennes, 1960 (online)
 La solution. Le programme du Parti québécois présenté par René Lévesque, 1970 (online)
 Cours initiation à l'économie du Québec, 2 volumes, 1975

Essays
 (online version)

Letters, articles
 "Qui sommes-nous? Où allons-nous?", in Le Devoir, October 30, 1996
 "Lettre ouverte aux souverainistes", in Le Devoir, December 19, 1996
 "La déclaration unilatérale est indispensable", in Le Devoir, September 16, 1997
 "Lettre ouverte aux juges de la Cour suprême", in Le Devoir, September 4 and 5, 1998
 "L'AMI menace-t-il à la souveraineté des États?", in L'Action nationale, November 4, 1998
 "Le libre-échange, les droits des multinationales et le dilemme de l'État", in L'Action nationale, May 5, 2001 (en)

Other
 Report of the Study Committee on Financial Institutions, 1969
 Brief submitted to the Committee on Institutions, responsible for conducting a broad consultation on Bill 99, 2000(online)
 Entre l'innovation et le déclin : l'économie québécoise à la croisée des chemins'', 2007 (conference at HEC)

External links

 
 Political blog 

1930 births
2015 deaths
Academics from Montreal
Alumni of the London School of Economics
Canadian Roman Catholics
Canadian economists
Commandeurs of the Légion d'honneur
French Quebecers
Grand Officers of the National Order of Quebec
Leaders of the Parti Québécois
Members of the Executive Council of Quebec
Parti Québécois MNAs
Politicians from Montreal
Premiers of Quebec
Université de Montréal alumni
Finance ministers of Quebec